The 2015–16 Air Force Falcons men's basketball team represented the United States Air Force Academy during the 2015–16 NCAA Division I men's basketball season. The Falcons, led by fourth head coach Dave Pilipovich, played their home games at the Clune Arena on the Air Force Academy's main campus in Colorado Springs, Colorado and were a member of the Mountain West Conference. They finished the season 14–18, 5–13 in Mountain West play to finish in tenth place. They lost in the first round of the Mountain West tournament to UNLV.

Previous season 
The Falcons the season 14–17, 6–12 in Mountain West play to finish in ninth place. They defeated New Mexico to advance to the quarterfinals of the Mountain West tournament where they lost to Boise State.

Departures

Recruiting

Recruiting Class of 2016

Roster

Schedule and results 

|-
!colspan=9 style="background:#0038A8; color:#A8ADB4;"| Exhibition

|-
!colspan=9 style="background:#0038A8; color:#A8ADB4;"| Non-conference regular season

|-
!colspan=9 style="background:#0038A8; color:#A8ADB4;"| Mountain West regular season

|-
!colspan=9 style="background:#0038A8; color:#A8ADB4;"| Mountain West tournament

See also
2015–16 Air Force Falcons women's basketball team

References 

Air Force
Air Force Falcons men's basketball seasons
Air Force Falcons men's basketball
Air Force Falcons men's basketball